Sidney Herbert Peterson (January 31, 1918 – August 29, 2001) was a Major League Baseball pitcher who played for the St. Louis Browns in .

External links

1918 births
2001 deaths
St. Louis Browns players
Major League Baseball pitchers
Baseball players from North Dakota
People from Hettinger County, North Dakota